Ņikita Kovaļonoks (born 2 July 1995) is a Latvian professional footballer who plays as a forward for Avia Świdnik.

Career

On 26 May 2013, after Kovaļonoks was substituted off during a Skonto reserve game, his father almost got into a fistfight with the head coach.

In 2013, after trialing for Dutch top flight clubs Vitesse, Ajax, and NAC Breda, he signed for another Eredivisie, ADO Den Haag, playing for their youth teams before joining Dutch lower league side VUC.

In 2015, Kovaļonoks signed for VFC Plauen in the NOFV-Oberliga Süd, the fifth tier of German football.

In 2020, he signed for Polish second division outfit Stomil Olsztyn after playing for FK Dinamo Rīga in the Latvian second division.

In July 2021, he joined Gibraltar National League side Lincoln Red Imps, making his debut on 6 July 2021 in the 2021–22 UEFA Champions League qualifying match against CS Fola Esch.

References

External links
 

1995 births
Living people
Latvian footballers
Association football forwards
VFC Plauen players
FK RFS players
FK Metta players
OKS Stomil Olsztyn players
Lincoln Red Imps F.C. players
Avia Świdnik players
Latvian Higher League players
Oberliga (football) players
I liga players
III liga players
Latvian expatriate footballers
Expatriate footballers in the Netherlands
Expatriate footballers in Germany
Expatriate footballers in Poland
Expatriate footballers in Gibraltar
Latvian expatriate sportspeople in the Netherlands
Latvian expatriate sportspeople in Germany
Latvian expatriate sportspeople in Poland